Typhoon Mangkhut, known in the Philippines as Typhoon Ompong, was a powerful and catastrophic tropical cyclone that caused extensive damage in Guam, the Philippines and South China in September 2018. It was the strongest typhoon to strike Luzon since Megi in 2010, and the strongest to make landfall anywhere in the Philippines since Meranti in 2016. Mangkhut was also the strongest typhoon to affect Hong Kong since Ellen in 1983.

Mangkhut, named for the Thai word for the mangosteen fruit, was the thirty-second tropical depression, twenty-second tropical storm, ninth typhoon, and fourth super typhoon of the 2018 Pacific typhoon season. It made landfall in the Philippine province of Cagayan late on September 14, as a Category 5-equivalent super typhoon, and subsequently impacted Hong Kong and southern China. Mangkhut was also the third-strongest tropical cyclone worldwide in 2018.

Over the course of its existence, Mangkhut left behind a trail of severe destruction in its wake. The storm caused a total of $3.77 billion (2018 US) in damage across multiple nations, along with at least 134 fatalities: 127 in the Philippines, six in mainland China, and one in Taiwan.

Meteorological history

On September 5, 2018, the Joint Typhoon Warning Center (JTWC) began monitoring a tropical disturbance near the International Date Line. Steady development ensued over the following days, and the system organized into a tropical depression on September 6, though operationally, the Japan Meteorological Agency (JMA) did not classify the system as a tropical depression until September 7. The depression soon intensified into a tropical storm, upon which it received the name Mangkhut. Throughout the next two days, the system underwent rapid intensification. Tight banding features wrapped around a developing eye feature. Favorable environmental conditions hastened Mangkhut's development, including low wind shear, ample outflow aloft, high sea surface temperatures, and high ocean heat content. Mangkhut achieved typhoon strength on September 9. A well-defined  eye became evident on satellite imagery as the typhoon approached the Northern Mariana Islands and Guam. The JMA assessed the storm's ten-minute sustained winds to be  at this time.

Substantial intensification ensued on September 11, as Mangkhut traversed the Philippine Sea. A second bout of rapid intensification took place as the storm consolidated significantly; a well-defined  eye became established during this time. The JTWC analyzed Mangkhut to have reached Category 5-equivalent intensity by 06:00 UTC, an intensity it would maintain for nearly four days. The typhoon made landfall in Baggao, Cagayan at 2:00 a.m. This made Mangkhut the strongest storm to strike the island of Luzon since Typhoon Megi in 2010, and the strongest nationwide since Typhoon Haiyan in 2013.

Traversing the mountains of Luzon weakened Mangkhut before it emerged over the South China Sea on September 15. The typhoon subsequently made landfall again on the Taishan coast of Jiangmen, Guangdong, China, at 5 p.m. Beijing Time (09:00 UTC) on September 16, with two-minute sustained winds of  according to China Meteorological Administration.

Following landfall, Mangkhut quickly weakened while moving westward. Late on September 17, Mangkhut dissipated over Guangxi, China.

Preparations

Philippines

Tropical cyclone warning signals were hoisted by the Philippine Atmospheric, Geophysical and Astronomical Services Administration as early as September 13. Preemptive and forced evacuations were implemented, especially in the Ilocos, Cagayan Valley and Cordillera administrative regions, the three regions widely expected to be severely affected by Mangkhut (Ompong). School class suspensions were announced as early as September 12 in preparation for the approaching typhoon. Medical and emergency response teams were placed on standby, and  worth of relief goods were prepared by September 13.

Highest Public Storm Warning Signal

Hong Kong
On September 12, as Mangkhut was forecast to severely threaten Hong Kong, the Hong Kong Government convened an inter-departmental meeting to discuss possible responses to the storm.

On September 14, the Hong Kong Government held a rare cross-department press conference over the preparation for Mangkhut, reminding Hong Kong citizens to "prepare for the worst".

On September 15, citizens living in Tai O and Lei Yue Mun were evacuated from these low-lying areas that have historically been very prone to storm surge. The Hong Kong Observatory issued the Strong Wind Signal No. 3 in the afternoon.

On September 16, as Mangkhut maintained its course towards the Pearl River Estuary, the Hong Kong Observatory issued the Gale or Storm Signal No. 8 during midnight. After dawn, as local winds rapidly strengthened, Hong Kong Observatory issued the Increasing Gale or Storm Signal No. 9. At 9:40 a.m., the Hong Kong Observatory issued the Hurricane Signal No. 10, the highest level of tropical cyclone warning signals in Hong Kong. This marked only the third time that this warning has been issued for the region since 1999, the others being with Typhoon Hato in 2017 and Typhoon Vicente in 2012. The signal was held for ten hours, the second longest duration ever, only behind the eleven hours during Typhoon York in 1999. The typhoon passed 100 kilometers south of Hong Kong at its closest, the joint farthest for a Hurricane Signal No. 10, with Typhoon Vicente.

Mainland China
On September 15, the meteorological bureaus of most cities in Guangdong issued red alerts for Typhoon Mangkhut, which is the highest level of alerts in Guangdong. The Guangxi Meteorological Bureau also issued a red alert for the typhoon at 5:00 p.m. Beijing Time. On the next day, the Meteorological Bureau of Shenzhen Municipality issued a red alert for rainstorm, which is the highest level of alerts in Shenzhen.

The Fujian Meteorological Bureau issued an orange alert for the typhoon, the second-highest alert level, on September 15.

On September 16, National Meteorological Center of CMA renewed a red alert for Typhoon Mangkhut, which is the highest level of alerts in China. On the same day, the Hainan Meteorological Bureau issued an orange alert for the typhoon. In Guangdong's provincial capital Guangzhou, schools, public transportation, and businesses were closed across the entire city for the first time since 1978.

Impact

Guam and the Northern Mariana Islands

After the center of Mangkhut passed near Guam, about 80% of the island lost electricity. The typhoon caused $4.3 million in infrastructural damage in Guam.

Philippines

After sweeping through Luzon, it left a trail of destruction. Almost all buildings in Tuguegarao, Cagayan's provincial capital experienced some sort of damage due to the typhoon. The typhoon blew away roofs, uprooted trees, destroyed buildings, and blocked roads with debris. Shards of glass was blown through the corridors in a hotel in Santa Ana. In Manila, extreme rains caused widespread flooding in urban areas. A tornado was reported in Marikina, eastern Metro Manila, at around 5:30 p.m. Philippine Standard Time on September 14, injuring two people. Over 105,000 families evacuated from their homes, and several airports in northern Luzon closed and airlines cancelled their flights until September 16.

On September 22, police confirmed that the typhoon had caused at least 127 fatalities; eighty deaths occurred in the collapse of a small mine in the town of Itogon, Benguet, where dozens of landslides buried homes. Philippine police also stated that another 111 people remained missing, as of September 22.

Francis Tolentino, a political adviser of President Rodrigo Duterte, announced that an estimated 5.7 million people nationwide had been affected by the storm. Luzon suffered extensive losses which more than doubled the expected worst-case scenario outlined by Agriculture Secretary Emmanuel Piñol.

As of October 5, the NDRRMC estimated that Mangkhut caused PHP33.9 billion (US$626.8 million) in damages in the Philippines, with assessments continuing.

Malaysia 
The tail winds from Mangkhut also affected some parts of Malaysia (as well as state of Sabah).

Taiwan
A thirty-year-old female teacher visiting Fenniaolin Beach in Yilan County was swept out to sea by a wave. Her body was recovered two days later.

Hong Kong

Mangkhut was the most intense typhoon to strike Hong Kong since Typhoon Ellen in 1983; the highest typhoon warning signal No. 10 remained in place for ten hours. The strongest winds in Hong Kong near sea level were recorded at the remote Waglan Island, with ten-minute sustained winds of  gusting up to 220 km/h   (137 mph). These winds caused the territory's many skyscrapers to sway and shattered glass windows; notably, the curtain walls of the Harbour Grand Kowloon were blown out by the winds. A construction elevator shaft on a high-rise under construction in Tai Kok Tsui collapsed onto an adjacent building, which had to be evacuated by police. Many roads were blocked by fallen trees and other debris, including major arteries such as Lockhart Road in Wan Chai and Kam Sheung Road, and service on the Mass Transit Railway (MTR) was halted on all above-ground sections of track.

About 1,219 people sought refuge in emergency shelters opened by the Home Affairs Department. The Hong Kong International Airport cancelled and delayed a total of 889 international flights. More than 200 people were injured, but no fatalities were reported. Due to the substantial damage and disruption caused by the typhoon, the Education Bureau announced that all schools would be closed on September 17 and 18. Insurance claims in Hong Kong amounted to HK$7.3 billion (US$930 million).

The day after the storm, massive crowds filled the territory's MTR system, which operated at a reduced level of service on some lines as some sections of the tracks had been blocked by debris. Most of the city's 600 bus routes also went out of service due to blocked roads.

Macau

A storm surge of up to  affected Macau. About 21,000 homes lost power and 7,000 homes lost internet access, and forty people were injured. For the first time in history, all casinos in Macau were closed. The Macau International Airport cancelled 191 flights on Saturday and Sunday (September 15 and 16). Total damage in Macau was estimated to be 1.74 billion patacas (US$215.3 million).

Mainland China

Typhoon Mangkhut caused the evacuation of over 2.45 million people. In Shenzhen, the storm caused power failures in thirteen locations, flooded the Seafood Street, and caused 248 tree falls. Transport was shut down in Southern China, and at least four people in Guangdong were killed in the typhoon. In Guangzhou, markets, schools and public transport were closed or limited in the wake of the storm on Monday, September 17, and residents were requested to minimize non-essential travel. Ferry services from Zhuhai's Jiuzhougang Port to Shenzhen and Hong Kong were suspended indefinitely. The Civil Air Defense Office of Guangzhou Municipality (Municipal Civil Air Defense Office) cancelled the annual air-raid drills scheduled for September 15 to avoid causing panic as Typhoon Mangkhut approached. Schools in Beihai, Qinzhou, Fangchenggang, and Nanning were closed on September 17. The trains to Guangxi were also closed on September 17.

In total, the storm killed six people and caused CN¥13.68 billion (US$1.99 billion) in damage.

Retirement

After the season, PAGASA retired the name Ompong for causing more than ₱1 billion in damage; in March 2019, PAGASA chose the name Obet to replace Ompong for the 2022 season.

Due to the damage and high death toll in Luzon, the name Mangkhut was officially retired during the 51st annual session of the ESCAP/WMO Typhoon Committee in February 2019. In July 2020, the Typhoon Committee subsequently chose Krathon as its replacement name.

See also
Weather of 2018
Tropical cyclones in 2018
 Typhoons in the Philippines
 Typhoon Wanda (1962) – Strongest typhoon recorded in Hong Kong
 Typhoon Hope (Ising; 1979) – One of the strongest typhoons that made its final landfall near Hong Kong.
 Typhoon Ellen (Herming; 1983) – A powerful typhoon that took a similar track through the Philippines in September 1983, and one of the strongest typhoon in Hong Kong
 Typhoon Zeb (Iliang; 1998) – An extremely powerful typhoon that made landfall in the same province of the Philippines
 Typhoon Megi (Juan; 2010) – Another powerful typhoon that made landfall in nearby Isabela province and affected South China and Taiwan
 Typhoon Kalmaegi (Luis; 2014) – A weaker typhoon which made landfall in the same provinces that Mangkhut did, around the same time in 2014
 Typhoon Haima (Lawin; 2016) – Similarly powerful typhoon which also made landfall in Cagayan
 Typhoon Hato (Isang; 2017) – Most recent typhoon to affect Hong Kong and Macau prior to Mangkhut

Notes

References

External links

 
 
 
 EMSR312: Super Typhoon Mangkhut over the Northern Philippines (damage assessment maps) – Copernicus Emergency Management Service
 EMSR310: Tropical Cyclone MANGKHUT-18 in Northern Mariana Islands and Guam (delineation maps) – Copernicus Emergency Management Service

2018 Pacific typhoon season
September 2018 events in Asia
Typhoons in Hong Kong
Typhoons in the Philippines
Typhoons in China
Typhoons in Macau
Typhoons in Taiwan
2018 disasters in the Philippines
2018 in Guam
2018 in the Northern Mariana Islands
2018 in the Philippines
2018 in Taiwan
2018 in Hong Kong
2018 in Macau
2018 in China
Mangkhut